Roy Blake may refer to:

Roy Blake Jr. (born 1956), American politician
Roy Blake Sr. (1928–2017), American politician
Roy William Blake (1906–1994), Canadian diplomat